Expedition of Hamza ibn 'Abdul-Muttalib, also known as Sīf Al-Baḥr platoon was the first expedition sent out by the Islamic prophet Muhammad. It was sent in A.H. 1 of the Islamic calendar in the month of Ramadan (March, 623 CE).

The raid, which was to intercept a caravan that belonged to Quraish, was undertaken by the Muhajirun (Muslim exiles in Medina) alone (none of the Ansar, Helpers of Madinah, participated in it).

Description
The raid was ordered by Muhammad seven to nine months after the Hijrah. It was led by Hamza ibn 'Abdul-Muttalib (Muhammad's uncle) and comprising 30 to 40 men with a definite task of intercepting a caravan that belonged to Quraish. ‘Amr ibn Hishām (Abu Jahl), the leader of the caravan was camping at al-‘Is with 300 Meccan riders.

The two parties encountered each other, aligned and stood face to face in preparation for battle but Majdi ibn ‘Amr al-Juhani, a Quraysh who was friendly to both the parties intervened between them; so both parties separated without fighting. Hamza returned to Medina and Abu Jahl proceeded towards Mecca. 

On that occasion, Muhammad accredited the first flag of Islam. Kinaz ibn Husain Al-Ghanawi was given the task of carrying it, and it was white in color.

Location
The event took place on the seashore in the neighborhood of aI-‘Īṣ (العيص), in the territory of Banū Juhayna, between Mecca and Medina.

See also
Muhammad as a general
List of expeditions of Muhammad
Muslim–Quraysh War

References

Books and journals

 

623
620s conflicts
Campaigns ordered by Muhammad
Muhammad in Medina